Rusty Jeffers (born May 14, 1964, Kenmore, New York) is an American IFBB professional bodybuilder. He grew up in Georgia and Boulder, Colorado and now lives in Phoenix, Arizona. Jeffers started bodybuilding at 12 and competed as early as at the age of 14. He won his first title at the age of 17 and won three years in a row in Teenage Arizona. He got his professional status in 2004 Masters National Championships.

Jeffers released a Pose Like a Pro DVD on his own in 2006 to teach athletes how to pose.

In 2002, Jeffers sat for a revealing interview with freelance writer Rod Labbe. Entitled "Slugging it Out," it ran in MuscleMag International.

Jeffers is teaming up with World Physique & Athletics Association (WPAA) to hold a bodybuilding show in his name: the 2015 Rusty Jeffers Southwest Championships on April 11, 2015.

Rusty won in Masters Pro 50+ class in 2014 Pittsburgh Pro. After 7 years, Rusty is going to compete again in 2021 IFBB Pro Legion Masters Championship in October.

Contest history

See also
International Federation of BodyBuilders
Bodybuilding
List of male professional bodybuilders
List of female professional bodybuilders

References

External links
Official website of International Federation of Bodybuilding & Fitness
Chest Training with Rusty Jeffers - Part I, The Fitshow 23
Chest Training with Rusty Jeffers - Part II, The Fitshow 24

1964 births
People from Kenmore, New York
American bodybuilders
Professional bodybuilders
Living people